Perissocarpa is a genus of flowering plants belonging to the family Ochnaceae.

Its native range is Southern Tropical America.

Species:

Perissocarpa ondox 
Perissocarpa steyermarkii 
Perissocarpa umbellifera

References

Ochnaceae
Malpighiales genera